Todos a la cárcel (Everyone to Jail or Everyone Off to Jail) is a 1993 Spanish comedy film directed by Luis García Berlanga. The script was written by Berlanga with his son Jorge Berlanga. The plot takes place entirely in a prison in Valencia on a day called Everyone to Jail (Todos a la cárcel), an event to reunite victims of the Francoist repression.

Cast
 José Sazatornil (credited as Jose Sazatornil 'Saza') as Artemio
 José Sacristán as Quintanilla
 Agustín González as Director
 Manuel Alexandre as Modesto
 Rafael Alonso as Falangista
 Inocencio Arias as Casares
 José Luis Borau as Capellan
 Gaspar Cano as Realizador TV
 Luis Ciges as Ludo
 Joaquín Climent as Ministro (minister)
 Marta Fernández Muro as Matilde
 Juan Luis Galiardo as Muñagorri
 Antonio Gamero as Cerrillo
 Chus Lampreave as Chus
 Eusebio Lázaro as Alcaraz

Accolades
It won at the 1993 Goya Awards, 'Best Director', 'Best Film' and 'Best Sound'.

References

External links
 

1993 films
1990s Spanish-language films
1993 comedy films
Best Film Goya Award winners
Films directed by Luis García Berlanga
Spain in fiction
Films set in Valencia
Spanish comedy films
1990s Spanish films
1990s prison films
Spanish prison films
Prison comedy films